Alex Miller was a Scottish football player during the 1880s and 1890s.

Career
Miller played for the vast majority of his career with Dumbarton, but had two short loan spells with Rangers and Clyde before retiring.

Honours
Dumbarton
 Scottish League: Champions 1890-1891;1891-1892
 Scottish Cup: Runners Up 1890-1891
 Dumbartonshire Cup: Winners 1888-1889;1891-1892;1893–94;1894–95 Runners Up 1895–96
 League Charity Cup: 1890–91
 Greenock Charity Cup: Runners Up 1888-89

References 

Scottish footballers
Dumbarton F.C. players
Rangers F.C. players
Scottish Football League players
Clyde F.C. players
Year of birth missing
Year of death missing
Association footballers not categorized by position